Bathytoma hedlandensis is a species of sea snail, a marine gastropod mollusk in the family Borsoniidae.

Description
The shell reaches a length of  45 mm.

Distribution
This marine species occurs off Port Hedland, Australia.

References

 Tippett, D.L. & Kosuge, S. (1994) Descriptions of a new species and a recently described species of the genus Bathytoma from the West Australia and the Philippines (Gastropoda Turridae). Bulletin of the Institute of Malacology Tokyo, 3, 19–21, pls. 8–9.
  Bouchet P., Kantor Yu.I., Sysoev A. & Puillandre N. (2011) A new operational classification of the Conoidea. Journal of Molluscan Studies 77: 273-308

External links
 

hedlandensis
Gastropods described in 1994